ZCCM Investments Holdings is a successor company to Zambia Consolidated Copper Mines Limited (ZCCM Ltd), of Zambia.

History

The company, ZCCM, was formed by a gradual process of nationalization and corporate concatenation which began in January 1970; the process is more completely described in the article Economy of Zambia.

A major switch in the structure of Zambia's economy came with the [Mulungushi Reforms of April 1968: the government declared its intention to acquire equity holdings (usually 51% or more) in a number of key foreign-owned firms, to be controlled by a parastatal conglomerate named the Industrial Development Corporation (INDECO). By January 1970, Zambia had acquired majority holding in the Zambian operations of the two major foreign mining corporations, the Anglo American Corporation and the Rhodesia Selection Trust (RST); the two became the Nchanga Consolidated Copper Mines (NCCM) and Roan Consolidated Mines (RCM), respectively. The Zambian government then created a new parastatal body, the Mining Development Corporation (MINDECO). The Finance and Development Corporation (FINDECO) allowed the Zambian government to gain control of insurance companies and building societies. However, foreign-owned banks (such as Barclays, Standard Chartered and Grindlays) successfully resisted takeover. In 1971, INDECO, MINDECO, and FINDECO were brought together under an omnibus parastatal, the Zambia Industrial and Mining Corporation (ZIMCO), to create one of the largest companies in sub-Saharan Africa, with the country's president, Kenneth Kaunda as chairman of the board. The management contracts under which day-to-day operations of the mines had been carried out by Anglo American and RST were ended in 1973. In 1982 NCCM and RCM were merged into the giant Zambia Consolidated Copper Mines Ltd (ZCCM).

However, after nationalisation, copper prices started declining, oil prices increased and
the effects of using the mining industry as a cash cow started showing. Copper production

Privatisation of ZCCM

Zambia Consolidated Copper Mines (ZCCM), which operated ten mines, three smelters, two refineries and a tailings leach plant. ZCCM was owned by Zambia Industrial and Mining Corporation (60.3%), an Anglo-American subsidiary ZCI Holdings (27.2%), RST International (7.0%) and the public (5.5%). ZCCM was sold in 1998 for just US$627 million, split into 7 units, including Konkola Copper Mine ($25 million), Kansanshi Mine ($28 million), Luanshya Mine ($35 million), Chibuluma Mine ($17.5 million), Chambishi Mine ($20 million) and others. The low price was criticised for being a result of bribery and corruption – with Anglo-American, which sat on the board of ZCCM, buying Konkola Copper Mines, ZCCM's flagship, for a song, critics alleged.
The mines were privatised after the copper prices had dropped from $2,300/tonne in
1997 to about $1,500/tonne in 1998 – and remained at this level until 2003. As the government was subsidising the mines by approximately $1 million a day, the privatisation was encouraged by a bit of arm-twisting:
"We were told by advisers, who included the International Monetary Fund and the World
Bank that (...) for the next 20 years, Zambian copper would not make a profit. [But, if we
privatised] we would be able to access debt relief, and this was a huge carrot in front of us
(...). We had no option," said then Minister of Finance Edith Nawakwi.

The objectives, which the Government was seeking to achieve through the privatisation of ZCCM, were to:
· Transfer control of and operating responsibilities for ZCCM's operations to private sector mining companies as quickly as practicable;
· Mobilise substantial amounts of committed new capital for ZCCM's operations;
· Ensure that ZCCM realised value for its assets and retained a significant minority interest in principal mining operations;
· Transfer or extinguish ZCCM's liabilities, including its third party debt;
· Diversify ownership of Copperbelt assets;
· Promote Zambian participation in the ownership and management of the mining assets; and
· Conduct the privatisation as quickly and transparently as consistent with good order, respecting other objectives and observing ZCCM Ltd's existing contractual obligations.

As part of the privatization process, the company's mining assets were unbundled and sold off as separate new entities or business packages to the private sector. The reason for unbundling the ZCCM Ltd into business packages was to promote diversity of ownership and minimise political and economic risks.

A two-stage privatisation process was adopted. Under Stage one, majority interests in the packages relating to certain of ZCCM Ltd's mining and power distribution operations were offered to trade buyers, which was to leave the transformed ZCCM Ltd as an Investments Holdings Company, with minority interest in each of these packages. Through ZCCM Investments Holdings Plc., Government has retained minority interests of not more than 21% within each of the business packages.

The privatisation of ZCCM commenced in 1996, after GRZ and the Boards of ZCCM and the Zambia Privatisation Agency (ZPA) approved the ZCCM Limited Privatisation Report and Plan presented by UK based financial and legal advisors, NM Rothschild & Sons and Clifford Chance, respectively.

Stage two of the privatisation of ZCCM envisaged GRZ disposing of some or all of its shareholding, with part of this being earmarked for Zambian institutional and private investors as a way of promoting Zambian participation in the mining sector.

GRZ obtained the support of the World Bank and the Nordic Development Fund for the Copperbelt Environment Project (CEP), to address environmental liabilities and obligations remaining with GRZ/ZCCM-IH following the privatization of mining assets.

The Environmental Management Facility (EMF) which is composed of multiple stakeholders, working as the EMF Steering Committee, was established by the Minister of Finance and National Planning as provided for by the protocols, for the purpose of prioritizing and approving subprojects of the CEP for funding. The project which became effective on 31 July 2003 ends in August 2008.

Apart from environmental responsibilities ZCCM-IH has the additional responsibility of managing the ex ZCCM employees trust fund and also the finalization sale of ZCCM properties.

In November 2011, the role and importance of ZCCM-IH have been highlighted, led by the Hon. Zambian Minister of Mines Wylbur Simuusa, representing the major shareholder.

"Through its state mining investment company, Zambia Consolidated Copper Mines Investment Holdings, the government is finalizing plans to start negotiations with mining companies aimed at increasing its stakes in projects to as much as 35%" he told the press.

"There is need for the country to have increased ownership in the mines and ZCCM-IH is an engine which can facilitate the process."

"ZCCM-IH is an important unit which if properly managed, can help the country realise huge benefits from the mining resources."

To that purpose, as Zambian presidential elections have emerged the victory of Patriotic Front leader Michael Sata, Mr. Wila D. Mung'omba was appointed as Executive Chairman of ZCCM-IH with effect from 1 December 2011.

Mr. Mung'omba who is not new to the affairs of the company, has in the past served as Group A Director of ZCCM Limited in 1996–98. Between 1995 and 1998, Mr. Mung'omba was World Bank's appointed team leader in the initial preparation of the ZCCM Limited privatization Report and Plan by the UK based Investment Bank NM, Rothschild & Sons and international law firm Clifford Chance. Later Mr. Mung'omba was involved in the creation of the present ZCCM-IH.

Mr. Mung'omba is a distinguished lawyer of many years, a former executive director of the International Monetary Fund, and former president of the African Development Bank Group. For five years he served as non-executive director on the initial Board of the Emerging African Infrastructure Fund (EAIF), a donor funded financial instrument to encourage public and private sector partnership in infrastructure development in Sub-Sahara Africa.

The objectives are to diversify the portfolio (coal, gemstones, oil,...) and to maximise returns from assets and shareholdings. Therefore, the management recently engaged negotiations with mining companies to get unpaid dividends as profits are huge.

The Social Impact of the Privatisation of ZCCM
The privatisation of ZCCM saw drastic cuts to social spending on health, education, urban infrastructure on the Zambian Copperbelt.

Assets & Shareholding
ZCCM owns significant amount of the stock of the following subsidiary Zambian copper mining companies:

Ndola Lime Company Limited (NLC)
ZCCM-IH has 100% shareholding in NLC

Kariba Minerals Limited Plc(KML)
ZCCM-IH has 50% shareholding in KML – Gemfields Plc has 50% shareholding in KML

Maamba Collieries Ltd (MCL)
ZCCM-IH has 35% shareholding in MCL  -  Nava Bharat Ltd has 65% shareholding in MCL

Konkola Copper Mines Plc (KCM)
ZCCM-IH has 20.6% shareholding in KCM  -  Vedanta Resources Plc has 79.4% shareholding in KCM
The grz has a golden share.

Kansanshi Mining Plc (KMP)
ZCCM-IH has 20% shareholding in KMP  -  First Quantum Minerals Ltd (FQM) has 80% shareholding in KMP

Copperbelt Energy Corporation Plc (CEC)
ZCCM-IH has 20% shareholding in CEC  -  Zambian Energy Corporation has 52% shareholding in CEC

Luanshya Copper Mines Plc (LCM)
[ZCCM-IH has 20% shareholding in LCM  -  China Non-Ferrous Metal Mining Ltd (CNMC) has 80% shareholding in LCM

Lubambe (ex Konnoco konkola North Mining)
ZCCM-IH has 20% shareholding in Konnoco, African Rainbow Mining 40% - VALE 40%

NFC Africa Mining Plc (NFCA)
ZCCM-IH has 15% shareholding in NFCA  -  China Nonferrous Metal Co Ltd (CNMC) has 85% shareholding in NFCA

Chibuluma Mines Plc (CMP)
ZCCM-IH has 15% shareholding in CMP  -  Metorex Ltd has 85% shareholding in CMP

Investrust Bank Plc
ZCCM-IH has 10,07% shareholding in Investrust (494,00,000 shares / 4,901,500,000)

Mopani Copper Mines Plc (MCM)
ZCCM-IH acquired 90% shareholding of MCM previously held by Glencore Corporation
through Carlisa Investment Corporation (73.1%) and First Quantum Mining (16.9%), giving ZCCMIH 100% control of Mopani. The Government of Zambia and Glencore Corporation signed an off-take arrangement deal. An off-take arrangement is simply an arrangement between the producer and a buyer to purchase or sell all or portions of the producer's forthcoming goods/ commodities to the market. This sort of agreement is commonly done with the mines to secure a market for their future production purposes. In this case, Glencore Corporation has agreed to sell 90% of its shares to ZCCM-IH, which will fully own the mines after the transaction has been fully settled. This is because ZCCM-IH and Glencore deal is based on a no-cash transfer basis.

Chambishi Metals Plc
ZCCM-IH has 10% shareholding in Chambishi  -  Eurasian Natural Resources Capital (ENRC) has 90% shareholding in Chambishi

Shareholders

Prior to privatization in 2000, ZCCM Ltd was a consolidated copper-mining conglomerate, majority-owned by the Government of the Republic of Zambia (GRZ). Put in other words, until 31 March 2000, ZCCM Ltd was a 60.3% state-owned, mine-operating company in which Zambia Copper Investments Ltd (ZCI), an associate company of Anglo American Plc, held 27.3% of shares, with the balance of 12.4% of shares held by private investors.

Since privatisation of ZCCM, ZCCM Investments Holdings Plc (ZCCM-IH) is an investments holdings company which is listed on the Lusaka Stock Exchange, the London Stock Exchange and on Euronext in Paris, and has the majority of its investments held in the copper-mining sector of Zambia.

The company's shareholders are the Government of the Republic of Zambia (GRZ), with 77.7% shareholding, and institutions and individuals, with 22.3% of shares.

Capital

Minority shareholders are spread throughout the world, in various locations.

Europe: England, Belgium, France, Netherlands, Scotland, Switzerland, Greece,
Channel Islands, Irish Republic, Portugal, Norway and the Principality
of Monaco.
Africa: South Africa, Zambia, Zimbabwe, Botswana, Tunisia, Egypt, Nigeria,
Algeria, Republique Du Congo and Morocco.
Australasia/other: Australia, New Zealand, India, Oman, Pakistan, Sri Lanka, Jamaica, Bahamas and USA.

Financial Summary 
ZCCM Investment Holdings Plc (LuSE:ZCCM) financial summary 5 years trend on income, balance sheet and cash flow information

Statement of Income Extract for the last 5 Years. 

All values in Zambian Kwacha.

Statement of Financial Position for the last 5 Years 

All values in Zambian Kwacha.

See also
Copper mining and extraction
List of Zambia-related topics#Z (ZCCM)

References

External links
Official ZCCM Investments Holdings (ZCCM-IH) website
ZCCM-IH Minority Shareholders' forum — mostly in French, financials data and reports in English.
US Government Paper: Mining in Zambia (1999)—
MBendi: ZCCM-IH webpage—
]—Policy Monitoring and Research Centre PDF document]—

Copper mining companies of Zambia
Companies based in Lusaka
Non-renewable resource companies established in 1982
1982 establishments in Zambia
Companies listed on Lusaka Stock Exchange